Connecticut Food Bank is a nonprofit organization, based in Wallingford, Connecticut.  As a member of Feeding America, Connecticut Food Bank secures food donations from a national and regional network of food donors, retail partners, manufacturers, wholesalers and farms.  Connecticut Food Bank supplies food to a network of local agencies and programs (such as soup kitchens, food pantries, and emergency shelters) serving nearly 270,000 food-insecure individuals of all ages across the six counties of Fairfield, Litchfield, Middlesex, New Haven, New London, and Windham.  In 2019, Connecticut Food Bank distributed enough food to provide nearly 22.5 million meals.

History 

Born from the concept of matching excess food supplies to individuals with limited resources, Connecticut Food Bank began distributing food in 1982 out of a 2,000 square foot warehouse in New Haven, supplying 400,000 pounds to 70 programs.  Today, through distribution centers in Wallingford and Bridgeport, and an affiliated distribution center in New London, Connecticut Food Bank provides 27 million pounds of nutritious food annually to people in need.

See also

 List of food banks

References

External links 

Food banks in Connecticut
Charities based in Connecticut
Organizations established in 1982
1982 establishments in Connecticut